Sela is a village in Sela district, Yahukimo Regency in Highland Papua province, Indonesia. Its population is 619.

Climate
Sela has a cool subtropical highland climate (Cfb) with heavy rainfall year-round.

References

Villages in Highland Papua